PgMP- what is it and why is it important?  PGMP May refer to: The Program Management Professional (PgMP)® certification indicates that an individual has gained advanced experience beyond the skills required to manage individual projects. This certification can provide a distinct advantage in employment and promotion.

To earn your Program Management Professional (PgMP)® credential, you need to meet the experience and education requirements, and pass the panel review and the multiple-choice examination.

Regardless of how advanced your program management experience or education might be, you should still prepare vigorously for the exam. Successful PgMP candidates typically use multiple study aids — including courses, self-study and study groups — and will spend many hours to prepare. Make sure you leave yourself plenty of preparation time before you take the multiple-choice exam.

Similar to this is PMP. 

The PMP exam is a vast and comprehensive assessment of your knowledge and ability to manage projects. It covers project management fundamentals, from start to finish, the project life cycle, cost, and time estimation techniques, managing risks and issues

In an advanced survey, it was researched and concluded that

Minimum five years/60 months of unique, non-overlapping experience on professional projects 
35 contact hours of formal project management education  

The total number of PgMP®s as on February 1, 2020, is 3158, amongst which vCare Project Management has produced 269 PgMP®s, i.e. 9% of the total global PgMP®s. The month of January 2020 has contributed 26 PgMP®s to the Program Management Community. The number of PgMP®s from vCare Project Management in January 2020 is 5, which is 19% of the total PgMP®s. Congratulations to the 26 new PgMP®s. 

Number of PGMPs in India is also growing, as per a credible source more than 37% of PMP are going for PGMP too. 

More or less 79% of managers including project, profile, and assistant managers are looking out for credible training and institutes for online training for PgMP. 

PgMP mangers in the world are highly increasing… day by day the number is growing up to 2345 certified PgMPs in a year. 

PgMP certification can help you in multitasking and professionally upraising the standard of your work life. 

The USA is leading the PgMP® club with 1253 PgMP®s which is 40% of the global PgMP®s
With a total number of 380, China is following the USA by adding 25 new PgMP®s to its count since Dec 1, 2019. 
India is in third place with 350 PgMP®s

 Program Management Professional (Project Management Institute)
 Program Management Plan (Army Corps of Engineers)